A toy store or toy shop is a type of retail business specializing in selling toys.

Notable examples 
 Hamleys, the world's oldest toy shop
 Toys "R" Us, international company now Tru Kids
 FAO Schwarz, famous American brand and store
 The LEGO Store, official store for Legos
 Build-A-Bear Workshop has the concept of making your own stuffed toy
 Learning Express Toys, franchise of specialty toys
Smyths Toys Superstores

History 

The first toy store was founded in 1760 by William Hamley in London, under the name of "Noah's Ark", later renamed to Hamleys. Set over seven floors, a Hamleys branch at 200 Regent Street in the West End of London opened in 1881. The famous toy store in New York City, FAO Schwarz, was founded under the name Schwarz Toy Bazaar. It was founded in 1862 by the German immigrant, Frederick August Otto Schwarz. The former largest toy retailer in the United States, Toys "R" Us, started business in 1948 by Charles Lazarus, a veteran of World War II. In 2015, FAO Schwarz closed, and did not reopen until after Toys "R" Us went bankrupt in 2018.

Economics 
Today, toy stores face competition from the online toy market. As a result, many large toy retailers have been rendered bankrupt. These competing websites include Amazon or eBay. Toys "R" Us cut prices in an attempt to compete, but it ultimately ended in failure. As Jeff P. Bezos explained, "For a toy store to survive, they've got to create the kind of fun that Amazon can't." Toy Stores that adopt this model by increasing in-store interactivity have been more successful in maintaining business. Another model many stores have adopted is an online alternative, specifically for the individual retailer.

Controversies 
There can be a large gender bias for the marketing of certain products. This includes using color to market products to a certain gender, or only showing one gender to market to that specific demographic. On the U.S. Disney Store website, the toys for boys are predominantly red, black, brown, or grey, while the toys for girls are mostly pink or purple. However, the toys meant for both boys and girls were mostly of the same color palette as the toys for boys.

References

External links

 Inside Toyland: Working, Shopping, and Social Inequality, by Christine L. Williams, University of California Press, 2008.

Retailers by type of merchandise sold